Erhan Mašović (born 22 November 1998) is a Serbian professional footballer who plays as a centre-back or defensive midfielder for Bundesliga club VfL Bochum.

Club career

Čukarički
Born in Novi Pazar, Mašović moved from his home town to Belgrade, where he joined Čukarički in summer 2013.
During the first half of 2015–16 season, Erhan spent on the bench several SuperLiga matches. Mašović signed his first professional contract with Čukarički at the beginning of 2016, along with a few more players from class. He made his official debut for the first team of Čukarički on 27 February 2016 in a match against Radnik Surdulica. He was also in starting 11 in next fixture, against Javor Ivanjica. Mašović made 39 appearances in all competitions for Čukarički between 2016 and 2017.

Club Brugge
Mašović signed a four-year contract with Club Brugge on 3 May 2017. On 19 July 2019, Mašović was loaned out to Danish Superliga club Horsens for the 2019/20 season.

VfL Bochum
On 5 October 2020, the last day of the 2020 summer transfer window, Mašović moved to 2. Bundesliga club VfL Bochum on a free transfer having agreed a three-year contract.

International career
Mašović scored a goal for U18 national team in a match against Israel, ending of 2015. Previously, he was a member of Serbia U16 and Serbia U17 national teams. In August 2016, Mašović was called into Serbia U19 squad for memorial tournament "Stevan Vilotić - Ćele", where he debuted in opening match against United States. Mašović got his first call in Serbian under-21 team by coach Goran Đorović in August 2017.

Mašović debuted for the senior Serbian team on 5 June 2022, in a 4–1 victory over Slovenia in the Nations League.

Career statistics

Club

International

References

External links
 Erhan Mašović stats at utakmica.rs 
 
 
 

1998 births
Living people
Sportspeople from Novi Pazar
Association football defenders
Serbian footballers
Serbian expatriate footballers
Serbia youth international footballers
Serbia under-21 international footballers
FK Čukarički players
Club Brugge KV players
AS Trenčín players
AC Horsens players
VfL Bochum players
Serbian SuperLiga players
Slovak Super Liga players
Danish Superliga players
Bundesliga players
2. Bundesliga players
Bosniaks of Serbia
Serbian expatriate sportspeople in Belgium
Serbian expatriate sportspeople in Slovakia
Serbian expatriate sportspeople in Denmark
Expatriate footballers in Belgium
Expatriate footballers in Slovakia
Expatriate men's footballers in Denmark
Expatriate footballers in Germany
Serbia international footballers